Sin's Pay Day is a 1932 American pre-Code crime film directed by George B. Seitz and starring Lloyd Whitlock, Dorothy Revier and Mickey Rooney. It was produced on Poverty Row as a second feature. It was later reissued under the alternative title 	Slums of New York with advertising material devoting greater attention to child actor Rooney, who had since emerged as a star at MGM.

Synopsis
Attorney Robert Webb makes a good living as a defense lawyer for gangsters. This disgusts his wife, who leaves him and goes to set up a charitable clinic. After getting a notorious mob leader acquitted on a technicality, Webb develops a conscience and turns to alcohol letting his practice collapse. Living on the streets, he is befriended by a boy who helps him gain his self-respect. When the boy is then killed by a bullet fired from a gangster's gun, Webb goes undercover to pose as a defense lawyer once more while secretly recording the incriminating conversation, which he turns over to the police. A reformed man, he and his wife reconcile.

Cast
 Lloyd Whitlock as Robert Webb
 Dorothy Revier as Iris Markey
 Mickey Rooney as Chubby Dennis
 Forrest Stanley as James Markey
 Bess Flowers as Jane Webb
 Hal Price as Jake Bernheim
 Harry Semels as Louie Joe
 Paul Panzer as Derelict Drinking Milk

References

Bibliography
 Pitts, Michael R. Poverty Row Studios, 1929–1940: An Illustrated History of 55 Independent Film Companies, with a Filmography for Each. McFarland & Company, 2005.

External links

1932 films
1932 crime films
American black-and-white films
Films directed by George B. Seitz
American crime films
Mayfair Pictures films
Films set in New York City
1930s English-language films
1930s American films